Marle is a village in  Singu Township, Mandalay Region of   Myanmar.

References

Populated places in Mandalay Region
Villages in Myanmar